Rynell Deon Parson (born July 11, 1990) is an American sprinter who specializes in the 100 meters. A native of San Antonio, Texas, Parson attended John Paul Stevens High School. He graduated from Louisiana State University in 2013 with a degree in sport administration.

References

External links

1990 births
Living people
American male sprinters
Track and field athletes from San Antonio